Laguna Heights is a census-designated place (CDP) in Cameron County, Texas, United States. The population was 3,488 at the 2010 census. It is part of the Brownsville–Harlingen Metropolitan Statistical Area.

Geography
Laguna Heights is located in eastern Cameron County at  (26.080060, -97.256172), on the south shore of Laguna Madre, a large lagoon connected to the Gulf of Mexico. The CDP is bordered to the south and east by the city of Port Isabel and to the west by the town of Laguna Vista.

Demographics

2020 census

As of the 2020 United States census, there were 962 people, 575 households, and 371 families residing in the CDP.

2010 census
As of the census of 2010, there were 3,488 people, 528 households, and 459 families residing in the CDP. The population density was 7,202.3 people per square mile (2,744.1/km2). There were 572 housing units at an average density of 2,070.2/sq mi (788.8/km2). The racial makeup of the CDP was 67.19% White, 0.85% African American, 0.30% Native American, 0.05% Asian, 29.40% from other races, and 2.21% from two or more races. Hispanic or Latino of any race were 93.32% of the population.

There were 528 households, out of which 56.8% had children under the age of 18 living with them, 64.8% were married couples living together, 15.0% had a female householder with no husband present, and 12.9% were non-families. 10.8% of all households were made up of individuals, and 2.8% had someone living alone who was 65 years of age or older. The average household size was 3.77 and the average family size was 4.04.

In the CDP, the population was spread out, with 37.5% under the age of 18, 12.2% from 18 to 24, 30.1% from 25 to 44, 14.8% from 45 to 64, and 5.4% who were 65 years of age or older. The median age was 25 years. For every 100 females, there were 100.4 males. For every 100 females age 18 and over, there were 97.9 males.

The median income for a household in the CDP was $18,083, and the median income for a family was $19,491. Males had a median income of $15,677 versus $14,861 for females. The per capita income for the CDP was $6,538. About 37.7% of families and 45.6% of the population were below the poverty line, including 55.4% of those under age 18 and 25.6% of those age 65 or over.

Education
Children living in Laguna Heights are zoned to schools in Point Isabel Independent School District. Children go to Garriga Elementary School (Grades K-2), Derry Elementary School, (3-5), Port Isabel Junior High School (6-8), and Port Isabel High School (9-12). All of the schools are in Port Isabel.

In addition, South Texas Independent School District operates magnet schools that serve the community.

References

Census-designated places in Cameron County, Texas
Census-designated places in Texas